Jambalaya is a Louisiana origin dish of Spanish and French influence, consisting mainly of meat and vegetables mixed with rice. 

Jambalaya may also refer to:
"Jambalaya (On the Bayou)", 1952 song by Hank Williams 
Jambalaya (horse) (foaled 2002), Canadian racehorse
Jambalaya Island, fictional island in Monkey Island series
Jambalaya Studios, founded by Bruce W. Smith
June Jambalaya, American drag queen